Hye-su, also spelled Hye-soo, is a Korean feminine given name. Its meaning depends on the hanja used to write each syllable of the name. There are 16 hanja with the reading "hye" and 67 hanja with the reading "su" on the South Korean government's official list of hanja which may be registered for use in given names.

People with this name include:
Kim Hye-soo (born 1970), South Korean actress 
Park Hye-soo (born 1994), South Korean actress
Oh Hye-soo (born 1995), South Korean actress

Fictional characters with this name include:
Yeo Hye-su, in 2001 South Korean film Bungee Jumping of Their Own

See also
List of Korean given names

References

Korean feminine given names